Calamagrostis varia is a species of flowering plant from the family Poaceae which is native to Europe.

Description

Fertile lemma is oblong and is of the same size as a spikelet, membranous and keelless. The fruits are caryopses with additional pericarp.

References

External links

varia
Flora of Europe